Ficus trigonata is a species of tree in the family Moraceae. It is native to North America and South America.

References

trigonata
Taxa named by Carl Linnaeus
Trees of the Caribbean
Trees of Mexico
Trees of Central America
Trees of South America
Trees of Guatemala
Trees of Peru
Taxonomy articles created by Polbot